Grand Mal may refer to:

 Grand Mal (New York City band), an alternative rock band
 Grand Mal (San Francisco band), a punk rock band
 Grand mal seizure, a seizure that affects the entire brain